Solveig Haugan (November 1, 1901 – June 8, 1953) was a Norwegian stage and movie actress and writer.

Solveig Haugan was born in Trondheim, Norway. She appeared most notably on the stage in the Trøndelag Teater production of På Kobberstad and the Det Norske Teatret  production of Ungen from the book Ungen: folkeliv i 4 akter (Oslo: Aschehoug, 1911) written by novelist Oskar Braaten (1881–1939).
 
Solveig Haugan is perhaps best remembered for her performance as Maja in the film Gryr i Norden released in Norway in 1939. Gryr i Norden was based on the true story of Norway's Kristiania Match Workers Strike of 1889 (fyrstikkarbeiderstreiken i Kristiania)  at the Østre Aker match factory of Bryn og Grønvolds Tændstikfabriker in Oslo. The film was written and directed by Norwegian filmmaker Olav Dalgard (1898–1980).

Solveig Haugan also wrote short stories for   Arbeiderbladet published by the Norwegian Labour Party.
She was the author on the novel Av jord er du kommet (Oslo: Falken, 1952)  about the industrialization of agriculture. She  died in 1953, just 51 years old.

References

External links
Fyrstikkarbeiderstreiken i Kristiania 
Gryr i Norden

1901 births
1953 deaths
Actors from Trondheim
Norwegian stage actresses
Norwegian film actresses
Norwegian writers
20th-century Norwegian actresses